General Olson may refer to:

Gregg P. Olson (fl. 1980s–2020s), U.S. Marine Corps major general
John M. Olson (general) (fl. 1990s–2020s), U.S. Air Force brigadier general
John T. Olson (1929–2011), U.S. Air Force brigadier general
Sven-Olof Olson (1926–2021), Swedish Air Force lieutenant general

See also
Frederik-Valdemar Olsen (1877–1962), Belgian Congo Force Publique general
Wilhelm Olssøn (1844–1915), Norwegian Army commanding general